Prunum virginianum is a species of sea snail, a marine gastropod mollusk in the family Marginellidae, the margin snails.

Subspecies
 Prunum virginianum hartleyana (Schwengel, 1941) (synonyms : Prunum hartleyanum (Schwengel, 1941); Marginella hartleyana Schwengel, 1941)

Description

Distribution

References

 Cossignani T. (2006). Marginellidae & Cystiscidae of the World. L'Informatore Piceno. 408pp

Marginellidae
Gastropods described in 1868